William Rioli (known as Junior Rioli since August 2022 and Willie Rioli beforehand) (born 4 June 1995) is a professional Australian rules footballer playing for the Port Adelaide Football Club in the Australian Football League (AFL), having initially been drafted to the West Coast Eagles. He attended Xavier College, Melbourne and was drafted by the West Coast Eagles with their third selection and fifty-second overall in the 2016 national draft. Coming from the Rioli family, he is the first cousin of Dean Rioli (Essendon Football Club), Cyril Rioli (Hawthorn Football Club) and Ronnie Burns (from his mother's side), first cousin once removed of current Richmond Football Club player Daniel Rioli and the nephew of Maurice Rioli.

Scandals
In September 2019, Rioli received an indefinite provisional suspension under the AFL and Australian Sports Anti-Doping Authority anti-doping code for an alleged adverse analytical finding for urine substitution.  Rioli publicly admitted to having smoked marijuana with other club members the night before his drug test, and is accused of attempting to swap his tainted urine with a clean sample in a Gatorade bottle. He was subsequently issued with an indefinite suspension from the AFL, and ruled out from competing with the West Coast Eagles in that year's finals series. Rioli was eventually handed a 2 year suspension in March 2021.

On 23 April 2021, Rioli was transiting through Darwin Airport where he was stopped and searched after drug detection dogs detected drugs. He was found to be carrying 25 grams of marijuana in his pants and was arrested and issued with a court attendance notice. He pleaded guilty, and was given a 12-month good behaviour bond. Rioli recommenced training with the West Coast Eagles just 2 months later in June. Rioli was scheduled to play his first game back in round 23 of the 2021 AFL season but was ruled out the week prior due to a tight hamstring.

Statistics
Statistics are correct to the end of the 2018 season

|- style="background-color: #EAEAEA"
|style="text-align:center;background:#afe6ba;"|2018†
|style="text-align:center;"|
| 44 || 24 || 28 || 14 || 182 || 90 || 272 || 77 || 63 || 1.2 || 0.6 || 7.6 || 3.8 || 11.3 || 3.2 || 2.6
|- class="sortbottom"
! colspan=3| Career
! 24 !! 28 !! 14 !! 182 !! 90 !! 272 !! 77 !! 63 !! 1.2 !! 0.6 !! 7.6 !! 3.8 !! 11.3 !! 3.2 !! 2.6
|}

References

External links

1995 births
Living people
West Coast Eagles players
West Coast Eagles Premiership players
Glenelg Football Club players
St Mary's Football Club (NTFL) players
Tiwi Bombers Football Club players
Australian rules footballers from the Northern Territory
Indigenous Australian players of Australian rules football
Northern Territory Football Club players
East Perth Football Club players
Rioli family
One-time VFL/AFL Premiership players